Sims Branch is a stream in northern Greene County in the U.S. state of Missouri. It is a tributary of the North Dry Sac River.

Sims Branch bears the name of an early settler.

See also
List of rivers of Missouri

References

Rivers of Greene County, Missouri
Rivers of Missouri